Bumatay is a surname. Notable people with the surname include:

Patrick J. Bumatay (born 1978), American attorney
Sam Bumatay (born 1999), Filipino actress